Utopía Live from MetLife Stadium is the second live album and second concert film by American singer Romeo Santos as a solo artist. It is based on the sold-out concert that took place on September 21, 2019, at MetLife Stadium. The film version was premiered on June 25, 2021, on Pay-Per-View along with a documentary titled Romeo Santos: King of Bachata. Both films were later released on July 30, 2021, on HBO Max.  The live album was later released on September 10, 2021, 11 days before the 2 year anniversary of the concert. The ending to the film in which the group performing "Inmortal" at MetLife was releasedon August 19, 2021. The live audio only version was released the next day as the main single for the live album.

Track listing 

The physical version is a 2 CD album. Track #1-10 on disc one, and track #11-20 on disc two.

 A lot of songs were performed at the concert with multiple artist. Only these artist made it to the album and film. Only 23 songs were shown in the film in which 20 of them made it to the audio only version.

References

2021 live albums
Romeo Santos live albums
Sony Music Latin live albums
Spanish-language live albums